Landsteiner is a surname. Notable people with the surname include:

 Karl Landsteiner (1868–1943), Austrian-American biologist and physician
 Landsteiner, a tiny, bowl-shaped lunar impact crater
 Donath-Landsteiner syndrome
 Landsteiner-Wiener antigen system

German-language surnames
Jewish surnames